Adão, a Portuguese variant of Adam, is both a surname and a given name. Notable people with the name include:

Surname:
Adão (born 1960), Portuguese footballer
Cláudio Adão (born 1955), Brazilian footballer
Eurípedes Amoreirinha, full name Eurípedes Adão Amoreirinha, (born 1984) Portuguese footballer
Felipe Adão (born 1985), Brazilian footballer
Joaquim Adão (born 1992), Angolan footballer

Given name:
Adão Dãxalebaradã (1955–2004), Brazilian singer and actor
Adão Nunes Dornelles, aka Adãozinho, Brazilian footballer
Adão Iturrusgarai (born 1965), Brazilian cartoonist 
Adão Pretto (born 1945), Brazilian politician

See also
Adão, parish in Guarda Municipality, Portugal
Adão e Eva, 1995 Portuguese film